The Rockingham County Baseball League is a summer baseball league in Rockingham County, Virginia and neighboring areas. It was founded in 1924, and has included teams from across Rockingham County and up and down the Shenandoah Valley. As of 2023, the league has 8 teams and has a 28-game regular season schedule where every team plays each other 4 times. The first round of the playoffs is the best out of three games, the second round is best out of five games, and the third and final round is best out of seven games.

Teams
 Grottoes Cardinals - Shifflett Field
 New Market Shockers – Rebel Park
 Stuarts Draft Diamondbacks – The Diamond Club

 Bridgewater Reds – Ray Heatwole Field
 Broadway Bruins – Broadway High School
 Clover Hill Bucks – Buck Bowman Park
 Montezuma Braves – Ruritan Park
 Elkton Blue Sox - Stonewall Memorial Park

Championships
 Clover Hill – 18
 Bridgewater – 17
 Linville – 11
 Grottoes – 9
 Stuarts Draft - 4
 Mt. Crawford – 4
 Dayton – 3
 Broadway – 3
 Harriston – 2
 Elkton – 2
 Keezletown – 2
 Ottobine – 2
 Spring Creek – 2
 Harrisonburg – 1
 Twin County – 1
 Waynesboro – 1
 Weyers Cave - 1
 Fishersville – 1
 Briery Branch- 1
 Montezuma – 1
 New Market – 1

Former teams
 Linville Patriots
 Fishersville Rangers
 Fishersville Cardinals 
 Briery Branch Braves
 Twin County Twins
 Harrisonburg Chic's
 Luray Cavemen
 Luray Colonials
 Shenandoah Indians
 Spring Creek
 Ottobine

Famous alumni
 Dell Curry
 Travis Harper
 Maven Huffman
 Alan Knicely
 Larry Sheets
 Wayne Comer
 Brian Bocock
 Lorenzo Bundy
 Tom Brookens
 Daryl Irvine
 Reggie Harris
 Erik Kratz
 Brenton Doyle
 Chase DeLauter

RCBL Champions

External links

Summer baseball leagues
Rockingham County, Virginia
College baseball leagues in the United States
Baseball leagues in Virginia
Sports leagues established in 1924
1924 establishments in Virginia